The family Trichinellidae includes the genus Trichinella.

Trichinella, also known as the trichina worm, is responsible for the disease trichinosis.

References 

Parasitic nematodes of animals
Trichocephalida
Nematode families